The Finding of Moses is an oil-on-canvas painting by Paolo Veronese, now in the Gemäldegalerie Alte Meister in Dresden and measuring 178 by 277 cm. It is one of at least eight works on the finding of Moses by him and his studio – another now in Lyon is thought to be the preparatory sketch for the Dresden work.

References

Collections of the Gemäldegalerie Alte Meister
Paintings by Paolo Veronese
Veronese, Dresden